The Face Behind the Mask may refer to:

 The Face Behind the Mask (1941 film), an American crime drama starring Peter Lorre
 The Face Behind the Mask (1977 film), a Taiwanese martial arts film directed by Chen Chi-hwa
 The Face Behind the Mask, a 1938 short film directed by Jacques Tourneur

See also
 Behind the Mask (disambiguation)